Murray Langston (born June 27, 1944), who frequently performed using the stage name "The Unknown Comic", is a Canadian actor and stand-up comedian best known for his performances on The Gong Show, during which he usually appeared with a paper bag over his head.

Early life 

Murray Langston was born in Dartmouth, Nova Scotia, Canada and left home at the age of 15 because his parents—disabled and financially strapped—could not afford to raise him and his younger siblings. He lived in Montreal (Park Ex) before he emigrated to the United States by joining the United States Navy. He served during the Vietnam War but never saw combat.

Career 
In 1970, Langston began his show business career on Rowan & Martin's Laugh-In doing impressions of a fork, a tube of toothpaste and a grandfather clock. Later—at the suggestion of Redd Foxx—he teamed with comedian Freeman King and they became regular performers on The Sonny & Cher Comedy Hour.

After more than 100 appearances with Sonny & Cher, Langston began to make appearances on other prime time television shows, including The Hudson Brothers Razzle Dazzle Show, The Wolfman Jack Show, and The Bobby Vinton Show. He also worked with Foxx, Joan Rivers, Jim Carrey, Ruth Buzzi, and many other comedians, as well as creating comedic situations—appearing in several segments—for Candid Camera.

Early in his career, Langston had invested in a nightclub restaurant called "SHOW-BIZ." Several now-famous people worked there as servers, including Debra Winger, Michael Keaton (then known as Michael Douglas), David Letterman, Gallagher, Tim Reid and Freddie Prinze; however, the club closed within two years, exhausting Langston's savings.

Strapped for cash, he accepted an offer to appear on The Gong Show. He was reportedly embarrassed about appearing on the show, so—with the director's permission—he put a paper bag over his head with holes for his eyes and mouth, memorized a few old jokes and burst onto the show as "The Unknown Comic." The character, a frenetic speed-jokester in smarmy attire, was a hit, and developed a cult following.

"The Unknown Comic" appeared on more than 150 episodes of the Gong Show and also entertained as a celebrity judge on several other television shows. He also wrote for The Gong Show for a short time as well as appearing regularly in Las Vegas and making the rounds of many popular talk and variety shows. In the early 1980s, Langston revealed himself as "The Unknown Comic" on an episode of Real People in which the show's hosts pulled off the bag over his head.  He also revealed his true identity at the conclusion of a match on the celebrity edition of the game show Bullseye.

Langston later produced The Unknown Comedy Hour for Playboy TV, followed by The Sex and Violence Family Hour which starred a very young Jim Carrey. He also wrote the screenplays for the films Night Patrol (1984), which he also acted in, Up Your Alley (1988) and Wishful Thinking (1997) as well as being the co-host of The NEW Truth or Consequences (1987). He also had a role in the children's TV series E.M.U-TV (1989) as "Murray the Technical Director."

Langston is credited as "Actual Unknown Comic" for his appearance in the film Confessions of a Dangerous Mind (2002).

He wrote, directed and performed in Dirty Jokes: The Movie and inspired by the hit stage show The Vagina Monologues he created and performed "one man's response" to the show, which he called The Weenie Man-o-logs.

Personal life 

Twice divorced by the early 1990s, Langston went into semi-retirement from show business to concentrate on raising his daughters as a single father. His elder daughter, Myah Marie, became a singer-songwriter who wrote and published more than 50 songs by the time she reached the age of 19; she has recorded with notable pop stars including Britney Spears. His younger daughter Mary continued to live with Langston on their hillside ranch near the mountain town of Tehachapi, California.

Since 2000, Langston occasionally appeared as a stand-up comic in Las Vegas and wrote a memoir, Journey Thru The Unknown... As of 2015, Langston resided in Bathurst, New Brunswick.

References

External links

1945 births
Canadian stand-up comedians
Canadian television personalities
Canadian male film actors
Canadian male screenwriters
Canadian male television actors
Living people
Male actors from Halifax, Nova Scotia
People from Dartmouth, Nova Scotia
Writers from Halifax, Nova Scotia
Canadian male comedians
20th-century Canadian screenwriters
20th-century Canadian male actors
20th-century Canadian comedians
Comedians from Nova Scotia